Tiény-Séably is a town in western Ivory Coast. It is a sub-prefecture of Facobly Department in Guémon Region, Montagnes District.

Tiény-Séably was a commune until March 2012, when it became one of 1126 communes nationwide that were abolished.

In 2014, the population of the sub-prefecture of Tiény-Séably was 8,099.

Villages
The seven villages of the sub-prefecture of Tiény-Séably and their population in 2014 are:
 Béoué (1 712)
 Gbadrou (1 005)
 Kaédrou (623)
 Sandrou (1 085)
 Tiény-Séably (1 782)
 Zé (1 045)
 Ziondrou (847)

Notes

Sub-prefectures of Guémon
Former communes of Ivory Coast